Hugo Duarte Sousa Luz (born 24 February 1982 in Faro, Algarve) is a Portuguese former professional footballer who played as a left back.

Honours
Porto
Primeira Liga: 2002–03

Vaslui
UEFA Intertoto Cup: 2008
Cupa României: Runner-up 2009–10

Farense
Portuguese Second Division: 2012–13

References

External links

1982 births
Living people
People from Faro, Portugal
Portuguese footballers
Association football defenders
Primeira Liga players
Liga Portugal 2 players
Segunda Divisão players
FC Porto B players
FC Porto players
Gil Vicente F.C. players
C.F. Estrela da Amadora players
F.C. Maia players
S.C. Olhanense players
S.C. Farense players
Liga I players
FC Vaslui players
Portugal youth international footballers
Portugal under-21 international footballers
Portuguese expatriate footballers
Expatriate footballers in Romania
Portuguese expatriate sportspeople in Romania
Sportspeople from Faro District